John Brian Morrissette (born October 10, 1956) is an athlete who represented the United States Virgin Islands. He competed in the men's pole vault at the 1984 Summer Olympics. He currently runs the "Estate Lindholm" resort on the Virgin Islands with his wife.

References

1956 births
Living people
Athletes (track and field) at the 1984 Summer Olympics
United States Virgin Islands male pole vaulters
Olympic track and field athletes of the United States Virgin Islands
Place of birth missing (living people)
Athletes (track and field) at the 1979 Pan American Games
Athletes (track and field) at the 1983 Pan American Games
Pan American Games medalists in athletics (track and field)
Pan American Games bronze medalists for the United States Virgin Islands
Medalists at the 1979 Pan American Games